Fətəlikənd (formerly Severskoye) is a village and municipality in the Saatly Rayon of Azerbaijan.  It has a population of 2,944.

References 

Populated places in Saatly District